This is a list of electoral district results for the 1947 New South Wales state election.

Results by electoral district

Albury 

 John Hurley (Labor) won the seat at the 1946 by-election, but it was regained by the Doug Padman (Liberal).

Annandale

Armidale

Ashburnham

Ashfield

Auburn

Balmain 

 Preferences were not distributed.

Bankstown 

 Preferences were not distributed.

Barwon

Bathurst

Blacktown 

 Preferences were not distributed.

Bondi

Botany

Bulli 

 Preferences were not distributed.

Burwood

Byron 

 Preferences were not distributed.

Canterbury

Casino

Castlereagh

Cessnock 

 Preferences were not distributed.

Clarence

Cobar

Concord

Coogee

Cook's River

Corowa 

Ebenezer Kendell had won the seat at the 1946 by-election following the resignation of Christopher Lethbridge.

Croydon

Drummoyne

Dubbo 

 Preferences were not distributed.

Dulwich Hill

Georges River

Gloucester

Gordon

Goulburn

Granville

Hamilton

Hartley

Hawkesbury 

 Preferences were not distributed.

Hornsby

Hurstville

Illawarra 

 Preferences were not distributed.

King 

|- style="background-color:#E9E9E9"
! colspan="3" style="text-align:left;" |After distribution of preferences

 Preferences were not distributed to completion.

Kogarah

Kurri Kurri

Lachlan

Lakemba 

 Preferences were not distributed.

Lane Cove 

 Preferences were not distributed.

Leichhardt

Lismore

Liverpool Plains

Maitland

Manly

Marrickville

Monaro

Mosman

Mudgee

Murray

Murrumbidgee

Namoi

Nepean

Neutral Bay

Newcastle

Newtown

North Sydney

Orange

Oxley

Paddington 

 Preferences were not distributed.

Parramatta 

 Preferences were not distributed.

Phillip 

 Preferences were not distributed.

Raleigh

Randwick

Redfern 

 Preferences were not distributed.

Rockdale

Ryde

South Coast

Sturt

Tamworth

Temora

Tenterfield

Upper Hunter

Vaucluse

Wagga Wagga

Waratah

Waverley

Willoughby

Wollondilly

Wollongong-Kembla

Woollahra

Yass 

 Preferences were not distributed.

Young

See also 

 Candidates of the 1947 New South Wales state election
 Members of the New South Wales Legislative Assembly, 1947–1950

Notes

References 

1947